Letter to His Father is the name usually given to the letter Franz Kafka wrote to his father Hermann in November 1919, indicting Hermann for his emotionally abusive and hypocritical behavior towards his son.

Kafka hoped the letter would bridge the growing gap between him and his father, though in the letter he provides a sharp criticism of both:

According to Max Brod, Kafka actually gave the letter to his mother to hand on to his father.  His mother never delivered the letter, but returned it to her son. The original letter, 45 pages long, was typewritten by Kafka and corrected by hand. Two and a half additional pages were written by hand.

The letter, translated into English by Ernst Kaiser and Eithne Wilkins, was published in a bilingual edition by Schocken Books in 1966, and included in several Schocken collections of Kafka's works. A new translation by Hannah and Richard Stokes was published by Oneworld Classics in 2008 under the title Dearest Father.

Editions

 Letter to His Father. Bilingual edition. New York City: Schocken Books, 1966.
 Dearest Father. (Oneworld Classics, 2008) 
 Letter to Father. Translated from the German by Karen Reppin. Illustrated with drawings by Franz Kafka and including an afterword on the creation and impact of the text. Vitalis Verlag, Prague 2016. .

The following collections include Kafka's Letter to His Father (Kaiser and Wilkins translation):
 Dearest Father. Stories and Other Writings. New York: Schocken Books, 1954.
 The Sons. New York: Schocken Books, 1989.

References

External links

Essays by Franz Kafka
Letters (message)
1966 non-fiction books